The Tatra Cup is an annual ice hockey tournament held in Poprad, Slovakia. It is the second oldest club tournament in Europe, after the Spengler Cup. 

The first installment of the Tatra Cup took place in 1929 in Starý Smokovec. Between the years 1932 and 1935 there were two different tournaments held, a national one and an international one. There were only two installments held from 1952 to 1968 because of problems with organization of the tournament. In later years international teams started to participate as well, e.g. Kölner EC in 1969. One year later for the first time a Swedish team played at the Tatra Cup – Surahammars IF, together with German SC Riessersee.

When a new ice hockey stadium was built in Poprad in 1973, conditions for the organization of the tournament improved considerably. In the anniversary year of the tournament 1979 a hockey club from East Germany Dynamo Weißwasser was invited.

Nowadays, the Tatra Cup is taking place every year in late August as a preparatory tournament for the upcoming season, at which mostly Czech and Slovak teams take part.

Tatra Cup winners

Performances

By club (international tournaments)

By club (national tournaments)

By country (international tournaments)

References

External links

 Tatra Cup 
 History
 Seasons of Tatra Cup

Sport in Poprad
Ice hockey tournaments in Europe
Ice hockey competitions in Slovakia
1929 establishments in Slovakia
Recurring sporting events established in 1929